Norrbotten County is the northernmost county or län of Sweden. It is also the largest county by land area, almost a quarter of Sweden's total area. It shares borders with Västerbotten County to the southwest, the Gulf of Bothnia to the southeast, the counties of Nordland and Troms og Finnmark in Norway to the northwest, and Lapland Province in Finland to the northeast.

The name "Norrbotten" is also used for a province of the same name. Norrbotten province covers only the eastern part of Norrbotten County – the inland mostly belongs to the Swedish Lapland province (Lappland).

The capital of Norrbotten is Luleå, whereas other significant towns include Boden, Kiruna and Piteå. The majority of the population lives in the namesake province, whereas the Lapland part of the county is sparsely populated. 

The northern part of Norrbotten lies within the Arctic Circle.

Provinces 

Norrbotten County consists of the entire province of Norrbotten and about two thirds of Swedish Lapland.

Geography 
Norrbotten County covers almost one quarter of Sweden's land area, but is sparsely inhabited. This is especially true for inland parts of Lapland.

The climate is generally cold, because of its northern location. However, the long summer days allow crops to ripen within two to three months, and agriculture is traditionally important, particularly near the coast and along the lower reaches of the Torne River. Grains, particularly barley, potatoes and turnips are grown to some extent, but the most important crop is hay for livestock. There are around 250 000 reindeer, in the winter herd, a number regulated by the Swedish state, which are herded by the Indigenous Sámi, organised in 15 Sámi Mountain villages, 9 Forest Sámi villages and 8 concession Sámi villages. Hunting and fishing is of major importance for the local inhabitants.

Major rivers in Norrbotten County (north–south) include the Torne, the Lule River, Kalix River, and Pite River. Rivers shared with the Västerbotten County include the Skellefte River and Ume River. Other rivers that flow directly to the sea and that are at least 100 km long are the Sangis River, Råne River, Åby River, and Byske River.

The county includes many islands in the Bay of Bothnia, which make up the Norrbotten archipelago.
It is divided into the archipelagos of Piteå (550 islands), Luleå (1,312 islands), Kalix (792 islands) and Haparanda (652 islands).
The largest island is Rånön in the Kalix archipelago.

Population 
The population has increased during the last hundred years. The estimated 2002 population was 250,000. In the 1912 census, the population was 166,641, (4,000 more males than females), of which about 120.000 were in the Norrbotten province part. Twenty years earlier, in 1892, the population was only 110.000. Since the 1960s, however, most municipalities of the county have experienced a decrease in population, particularly those inland.

Riksdag elections 
The table details all Riksdag election results of Norrbotten County since the unicameral era began in 1970. The blocs denote which party would support the Prime Minister or the lead opposition party towards the end of the elected parliament.

History 
During the Middle Ages, Norrbotten was considered to be terra nullius ("no man's land"). The area was populated by Sami, Kvens and different people related to the Finns. From the Middle Ages on, the Swedish kings tried to colonise and Christianise the area. However; even today, there are Finnish and Sami minorities living in the area, who have maintained their own culture and customs.

In the first half of the 17th century several ore deposits were discovered in what is now known as Norrbotten County. The silver of Nasafjäll was discovered during the autumn of 1634 and subsequently mined from 1635 to 1659 and from the 1770s to 1810.

Following the Finnish War in 1809, Västerbotten County was split between Sweden and Finland, with the larger part remaining within the Swedish borders. In 1810, the county was divided again when Norrbotten County was created out of the northern part, on the Swedish side. Most people in Norrbotten County still refer to the entire county, including the areas in Swedish Lapland, when they say 'Norrbotten'.

The natural resources (hydroelectricity, timber, and minerals, especially iron) of Norrbotten have played a key role in the industrialization of Sweden. The 20th century saw strong mobility in and out of the county, with many young people moving south and people from other parts of the country moving in. In the 1970s and 1980s, the drainage of (mostly young) workers due to high unemployment was considerable, and people in the area began to voice feelings of being misunderstood or economically abused by the south and especially the capital Stockholm.

Heraldry 
The coat of arms of Norrbotten County combines the arms of the provinces Västerbotten and Lappland and was granted in 1949. Since 1995 the province Norrbotten has a coat of arms of its own, but the county arms have not been changed accordingly. When it is shown with a royal crown, it represents the County Administrative Board. Blazon: "Quartered, the arms of Västerbotten and the arms of Lappland."

Culture 

Many different cultures can be found in Norrbotten County: Sami culture, Finnish culture (via Tornedalians) and the Swedish settler-culture. Many of the old local Swedish and Finnish dialects have survived in the area. The people of Norrbotten County have a saying: "I am not a Swede; I am a Norrbothnian". A local way of speaking, coupled with understated irony, is also sometimes used as a means to exclude southerners. These contrasts are well known throughout Sweden and often appear in TV, films, literature and folklore connected to Norrbotten, for characterizing, satiric or dramatic purposes (e.g. some characters in the books of Eyvind Johnson or the police detective Einar Rönn in the crime novels of Maj Sjöwall and Per Wahlöö).

The coast has the historical cities of Luleå and Piteå. Luleå's Gammelstad ("Old town"), which is 10 km north of the present downtown, has been declared a UNESCO World Heritage Site.

Apart from the Swedish language, Sami, Meänkieli, and Finnish may be used in dealing with government agencies, courts, municipalities, preschools and nursing homes in parts of Norrbotten County. The Sami language has official minority language status in Arjeplog, Gällivare, Jokkmokk, and Kiruna municipalities. Meänkieli and Finnish have the same status in Gällivare, Haparanda, Kiruna, Pajala, and Övertorneå municipalities.

Administration 
The main aims of the County Administrative Board are to fulfil the goals set in national politics by the Riksdag and the Government, to promote the development of the county, and to establish regional goals.  The County Administrative Board is a Government Agency headed by a Governor (see List of Norrbotten Governors).

Politics
Results of the 2010 Swedish general election in Norrbotten:

Swedish Social Democratic Workers' Party  51.86%
Moderate Party  16.38%
Left Party  9.29%
Green Party  5.26%
Centre Party  4.65%
Liberal People's Party  4.32%
Sweden Democrats  3.85%
Christian Democrats  3.29%
Other parties  1.10%

Municipalities 

The Sami language can be used in contacts with local authorities in Arjeplog, Gällivare, Jokkmokk, and Kiruna. Similarly, Finnish and Meänkieli can be used in Gällivare, Haparanda, Kiruna, Pajala, and Övertorneå.

Foreign background 
SCB have collected statistics on backgrounds of residents since 2002. These tables consist of all who have two foreign-born parents or are born abroad themselves. A majority of them are of Finnish descent. The chart lists election years and the last year on record alone.

Transportation
The main mode of person travel inside Norrbotten is by car. The distances are long, e.g. 345 km between Luleå and Kiruna.
The roads have been given relatively high speed limits compared to southern Sweden, usually 100–110 km/h.

Norrbotten has a railway network focused on heavy freight traffic. There are two main railways. Stambanan genom övre Norrland connects Norrbotten with central and southern Sweden. Malmbanan connects Luleå with the iron mines in Gällivare and Kiruna and the ice-free port of Narvik. Malmbanan has highest amount of freight traffic in Scandinavia, especially the part between Kiruna and Narvik.

Air travel is the main mode of travel between Norrbotten and southern Sweden. The main airport is Luleå Airport, sixth largest in Sweden. Other airports are 
Arvidsjaur Airport, Gällivare Airport, Kiruna Airport and Pajala Airport.

See also
North Sweden European Office

References and notes 

 article Norrbottens län from Nordisk familjebok (1912).

Books and articles

Öhman, May-Britt (2016). TechnoVisions of a Sámi Cyborg: Reclaiming Sámi Body-, Land-, and Waterscapes After a Century of Colonial Exploitations in Sábme, in Illdisciplined Gender: Engaging Questions of Nature/Culture and Transgressive Encounters / [ed] Bull, Jacob; Fahlgren, Margaretha, Rotterdam: Springer, 63–98. 
Elenius, Lars, Allard, Christina & Sandström, Camilla (eds.), Indigenous rights in modern landscapes: Nordic conservation regimes in global context, Routledge, New York, NY, 2017,

External links 

Norrbotten County Administrative Board
Norrbotten County Council 
Norrbotten Regional Association of Local Authorities
Sámi Parliament Information Center

 
Counties of Sweden
County
Lapland (Sweden)
States and territories established in 1810
1810 establishments in Sweden